Victory Monument station is a BTS skytrain station, on the Sukhumvit Line in Ratchathewi District, Bangkok, Thailand. The station is located on Phaya Thai Road to the south of the Victory Monument, one of the landmark and major traffic intersection of Bangkok. The station is linked to all four corners of the traffic circle by the skybridge almost around the monument. There are many food stalls, clothing shops and malls around the station, as the monument is a major BMTA bus stop of Bangkok and also van terminals from suburbs and provinces around the capital.

See also
 Bangkok Skytrain

BTS Skytrain stations